Constantin Ion Parhon (15 October 1874 – 9 August 1969) was a Romanian neuropsychiatrist, endocrinologist and politician. He was the first head of state of the Romanian People's Republic from 1947 to 1952. Parhon was President of the Physicians and Naturalists Society in Iași, director of medical institutes, professor, and a titular member of the Romanian Academy.

Biography
Born in Câmpulung to the schoolteacher Ioan Parhon and his wife Maria (née Bauer), he completed lyceum in Ploiești and graduated from the University of Bucharest, where he also received his MD. He later received an Honorary Doctorate from Charles University in Prague (1948).

Parhon taught Neurology and Psychiatry at the School of Medicine of the University of Iași (1912–1933), and, from 1933, Endocrinology at the Faculty of Medicine of the University of Bucharest. Parhon was the founder of the Romanian school of endocrinology. In 1909, he co-authored with Moise Goldstein the first book on endocrinology, Secrețiile Interne ("Internal Secretions"). Later on, he published a Handbook of Endocrinology, co-written with M. Goldstein and Ștefan-Marius Milcu (3 volumes, 1945–1949). Parhon published over 400 titles, and was known for his encyclopaedic knowledge. Besides the afore-mentioned works, some of his other well-known works are Old Age and Its Treatment (1948), The Age Biology (1955), and Selected Works (5 volumes, 1954–1962).

As a socialist militant who, according to his own testimony, was influenced by the works of Karl Marx in his teens, Parhon was one of the founders of a Laborer Party (Partidul Muncitoresc), a short-lived group that fused into the left-wing Peasants' Party in 1919. A short while after the fusion, Parhon split with the group and became politically inclined toward the Workers' Party of Romania.

He allegedly protested against Romania's participation in World War II on the Axis side (see Romania during World War II), but, according to some sources, he was also a representative in Romania for the Reich-based chemical and pharmaceutical company Merck Darmstadt. In November 1944, after the August 23 King Michael's Coup that led Romania to switch sides in the war and join the Allies, he became President of the Romanian Association for Strengthening the Ties with the Soviet Union, which had been founded at his villa in Sinaia. He was a deputy in Parliament (known as the Assembly of Deputies) and the Great National Assembly between 1946 and 1961.

After the forced abdication of King Michael I on 30 December 1947, the Deputies' Assembly adopted Law No. 363, through which Romania became a People's Republic and the 1923 Constitution was repealed. The same law provided for a Presidium composed of five members (elected by the Deputies' Assembly) to exercise the executive powers in the state; alongside Parhon, its members were Mihail Sadoveanu, Ștefan Voitec, Gheorghe Stere, and Ion Niculi. Shortly afterwards, Parhon became the President of the Presidium, thus becoming Romania's head of state.

On 13 April 1948, the Parliament adopted a new Constitution, which borrowed heavily from the Soviet model of 1936 and entrusted the supreme powers to the Great National Assembly – which in turn elected a Presidium, composed of a president, three vice-presidents, a secretary and 14 members. The same day, Parhon was elected as President of the Presidium, though the real power in the state was exercised by the Romanian Workers' Party and its First Secretary, Gheorghe Gheorgiu-Dej. On 22 August 1950, he issued a decree  (together with Marin Florea Ionescu) whereby Brașov was renamed Orașul Stalin (Stalin City), "in honor of the great genius of working humanity, the leader of the Soviet people, the liberator and beloved friend of our people, Joseph Vissarionovich Stalin."

Parhon was a member of the Romanian Academy and other scientific societies. He was awarded the title of Hero of Socialist Labor and received the State Prize. He liked to be referred to as a "citizen-scientist".

He resigned from political office in June 1952, dedicating the rest of his life to scientific research. He was buried in the round hall of The Monument of the Heroes for the Freedom of the People and of the Motherland, for Socialism in Bucharest's Carol Park. In the aftermath of the Romanian Revolution of December 1989, his remains were exhumed in 1991, and interred in another cemetery.

Notes

References

Adrian Cioroianu, Pe umerii lui Marx. O introducere în istoria comunismului românesc ("On the Shoulders of Marx. An Incursion into the History of Romanian Communism"), Editura Curtea Veche, Bucharest, 2005
Vasile Niculae, Ion Ilincioiu, Stelian Neagoe, Doctrina țărănistă în România. Antologie de texte ("Peasant doctrine in Romania. Collected Texts"), Editura Noua Alternativă, Social Theory Institute of the Romanian Academy, Bucharest, 1994

1874 births
1969 deaths
Heads of state of Romania
Members of the Chamber of Deputies (Romania)
Members of the Great National Assembly
People from Câmpulung
Titular members of the Romanian Academy
Romanian endocrinologists
Romanian communists
University of Bucharest alumni
Academic staff of the University of Bucharest
Academic staff of Alexandru Ioan Cuza University
Peasants' Party (Romania) politicians
Members of the German Academy of Sciences at Berlin